The 1949–50 St. Francis Terriers men's basketball team represented St. Francis College during the 1949–50 NCAA men's basketball season. The team was coached by Daniel Lynch, who was in his second year at the helm of the St. Francis Terriers. The team was a member of the Metropolitan New York Conference and played their home games at the Bulter Street Gymnasium in their Cobble Hill, Brooklyn campus and at the II Corps Artillery Armory in Park Slope, Brooklyn.

Last season the Terriers were the first team in the New York City area to have a basketball game televised, and this season the Terriers had six games televised on WPIX and WOR-TV  from the II Corps Artillery Armory.

Roster

Schedule and results

|-
!colspan=12 style="background:#0038A8; border: 2px solid #CE1126;;color:#FFFFFF;"| Exhibition

|-
!colspan=12 style="background:#0038A8; border: 2px solid #CE1126;;color:#FFFFFF;"| Regular Season

|-
!colspan=12 style="background:#0038A8; border: 2px solid #CE1126;;color:#FFFFFF;"| National Catholic Invitation Tournament

                             
|-

National Catholic Invitation Tournament
Originally the tournament was to take place at Loyola College in Baltimore, MD from March 15 to March 22 and feature sixteen teams. Yet, because of segregation and protest from St. Francis College about the unequal treatment of its black players, the tournament was moved to Albany, NY and featured eight teams. Creighton was favored to win the tournament, although they had a 13–13 record going into the tournament the Bluejays had the toughest schedule of the eight competing teams.

References

St. Francis Brooklyn Terriers men's basketball seasons
St. Francis
Saint Francis
Saint Francis